The 2011 MLS Supplemental Draft is a secondary draft that was held by Major League Soccer on January 18, 2011.  The draft consisted of three rounds with each of the 18 MLS clubs participating. The return of the Supplemental Draft after a two-year hiatus coincided with the return of the MLS Reserve Division in 2011.

Player selection

Fifty-four players were selected during the three rounds. Vancouver Whitecaps FC had the first overall selection in the draft, followed by the Portland Timbers. The following eight selections were from teams that failed to qualify for the 2010 MLS Cup Playoffs, starting with the team holding the fewest 2010 regular-season points (three points per win, one point per draw). The subsequent eight selection positions of clubs were sorted by fewest regular-season points, from among teams that went out in the same round of the MLS Cup Playoffs. As similar in other drafts, teams were permitted to trade these rights away to other teams in exchange for other rights such as players, special roster spots, or other rights of interest.

The fourth round of the 2011 MLS SuperDraft was eliminated when the Supplemental Draft was re-instated. Traded fourth-round selections in the 2011 SuperDraft were converted into traded first-round selections in the 2011 Supplemental Draft.

Round one

Round one trades

Round two

Round three

Selections by position

References

Categories 

Major League Soccer drafts
Mls Supplemental Draft, 2011
MLS Supplemental Draft